Anime Complex was a series of omnibus Japanese anime shows broadcast on WOWOW and Kids Station.  It featured two unrelated series from various producers (notably Bandai Visual and Pony Canyon) of 15 minutes each per airing, and cycled as one series ended. It had three runs from 1998 to 2001.

Broadcasting 
The first, Anime Complex, was broadcast on WOWOW from April 6 to September 28, 1998.  It aired the following anime:

Maico 2010
Neo Ranga
The Adventures of Mini-Goddess

The program was a large success, leading to a second program, Anime Complex II, which cycled shows as they ended.  In the course of its run (October 5, 1998, to April 4, 2000), it contained the following shows:

D4 Princess
Kurogane Communication
Neo Ranga
Omishi Magical Theater: Risky Safety
Steel Angel Kurumi

Another series, Anime Complex Night, followed, with season 1 airing from April 7 to June 29, 2001, on WOWOW and season 2 airing from April 2 to June 29, 2002, on KIDS STATION. It featured the following:

Hanaukyo Maid Team (season 1) 
Rizelmine (season 2)
Steel Angel Kurumi 2

References 
1998 anime
2001 anime
Television programming blocks in Asia